Richard “Tuff” Green (born July 23, 1911, Greenville, MS) was a jazz and R&B bassist and bandleader.

After studying with Jimmie Lunceford in Memphis, in the late 1940s he led the Rocketeers, which featured, among others, Phineas Newborn Sr., Ben Branch, Leonard “Doughbelly” Campbell, Willie Mitchell, Hank Crawford, saxophonist Irvin Reason, trumpeter Gene "Bowlegs" Miller, trombonist Walter "Tang" Smith, saxophonist James Luper, and pianist Harry Gibson Mose Allison, having heard them in 1947, has credited Tuff Green and His Rocketeers with playing the first “rock and roll”.

As an established bandleader in Memphis, in 1951 he later put together the pickup band for BB King’s first hit, “Three O’Clock Blues”, Ben Branch and Phineas Newborn Sr., along with Newborn's sons, Phineas Jr. and Calvin, together with Ben Branch’s brother Thomas, and Sammie Jett and which was recorded in Green’s sitting room. A previous version of the song had been recorded in September 1951 with King backed by Richard Sanders and Adolph "Billy" Duncan on tenor saxes, Johnny Ace, Green, and Earl Forest on drums.

Bobby Bland’s first recording was also made in Green’s sitting room, and featured Green, Johnny Ace, Earl Forest, M.T. (Matthew) Murphy, Little Junior Parker, Ike Turner, and Rosco Gordon, whose "No More Doggin'", also recorded at Green's home, was a #3 R&B hit.

Discography

Album features 

 2000: A Shot In The Dark - Nashville Jumps (Bear Family Records)
 2007: Bullet Records - Rhythm & Blues (Blue Label)
 2010: Bullet Records Jump, Blues & Ballads (SPV GmbH)

Albums as a sideman 

 1977: Rosco Gordon – The Legendary Sun Performers (Charly Records)
 2010: Ike Turner – That Kat Sure Could Play! The Singles 1951-1957 (Secret Records Limited)
 2013: B.B. King – The Indispensable 1949-1962 (Frémeaux & Associés)

References

External links
Jenkins, Earnestine Lovelle (2009) African Americans in Memphis, p. 83. Arcadia Publishing At Google Books. Retrieved 2 July 2013. Photo of Tuff Green playing at the Mitchell Hotel in Memphis.

American jazz double-bassists
Male double-bassists
American rhythm and blues musicians
African-American musicians
American bandleaders
Year of death unknown
Year of birth unknown
1911 births
American male jazz musicians
20th-century African-American people